Filigranski pločnici (Croat. Filigree Pavements) is the third studio album of the Yugoslavian rock band Azra, released through Jugoton in 1982 on double vinyl.

Filigranski pločnici placed 8th in the list of 100 best Yugoslav pop and rock albums, compiled by 70 Serbian rock critics in 1998.

Track listing
All music and lyrics written by Branimir Štulić.

Personnel 
Azra
Branimir Štulić – Guitars, lead vocals
Mišo Hrnjak – Bass, backup vocals, piano in track 10
Boris Leiner – Drums, backup vocals, lead vocals in track 4

Additional musicians
Miroslav Sedak-Benčić - Saxophone, flute, organ, piano

Artwork
Ivan Ivezić – Design
Milisav Vesović - Photography

Production
Branimir Štulić – Producer
Siniša Škarica - Executive producer
Recorded by Janko Mlinarić

References

Azra albums
1982 albums
Jugoton albums